David Dyas is a former professional rugby league footballer who played in the 1970s and 1980s.

Playing career
Dyas made his début for Featherstone Rovers on Sunday 7 January 1973.

Challenge Cup Final appearances
Dyas played , i.e. number 2, in Featherstone Rovers' 9-24 defeat by Warrington in the 1974 Challenge Cup Final during the 1973–74 season at Wembley Stadium, London on Saturday 11 May 1974, in front of a crowd of 77,400.

References

Bramley RLFC players
Featherstone Rovers players
Living people
Place of birth missing (living people)
English rugby league players
Rugby league wingers
Year of birth missing (living people)